Events from the year 1905 in France.

Incumbents
President: Émile Loubet
President of the Council of Ministers: 
 until 12 March: Emile Combes  
 12 March-25 October: Maurice Rouvier 
 starting 25 October: Georges Clemenceau

Events
February – Fierce storm on the Calvados coast. 
31 March – German emperor William II asserts German equality with France in Morocco, triggering the Tangier or First Moroccan Crisis.
13 May – Mata Hari debuts in Paris.
9 December – 1905 French law on the Separation of the Churches and the State is passed, enacting laïcité.
Louis Delâge produces the first Delage automobile in Levallois-Perret.
Renault Type AG taxicab begins production at Billancourt and 1,500 are ordered for use in Paris.

Arts and literature
October – The Fauvist artists, notably Henri Matisse, first exhibit, at the Salon d'Automne in Paris.

Sport
9–30 July – Third Tour de France, won by Louis Trousselier.

Births

January to March
17 January – Louis Armand, engineer (died 1971)
21 January – Christian Dior, fashion designer (died 1957)
7 February
Paul Nizan, philosopher and writer (died 1940)
René de Possel, mathematician (died 1974)
8 February – Andre Richaume, archetier/bowmaker (died 1966)
3 March – Marie Glory, actress (died 2009)
14 March – Raymond Aron, philosopher, sociologist and political scientist (died 1983)
20 March – Jean Galia (died 1949), boxer and pioneering rugby footballer
28 March – René Maheu, professor of philosophy and Director General of UNESCO (died 1975)

April to June
2 April – Edmond Jouhaud, one of four generals who staged the Algiers putsch of 1961 (died 1995)
4 April – Eugène Bozza, composer (died 1991)
5 April – Waldeck Rochet, politician (died 1983)
13 April – Pierre Schneiter, politician (died 1979)
14 April – Jean Pierre-Bloch, French Resistance member (died 1999)
24 April – Pierre Chevalier, caver and mountaineer (died 2001)
6 May – René Dreyfus, motor racing driver (died 1993)
14 May – Jean Daniélou, theologian and historian (died 1974)
15 May – Albert Dubout, cartoonist, illustrator, painter and sculptor (died 1976)
20 June – Hélène Bouvier, operatic mezzo-soprano (died 1978)
21 June – Jacques Goddet, sports journalist and Tour de France director (died 2000)
21 June – Jean-Paul Sartre, philosopher, dramatist, novelist and critic (died 1980)

July to September
25 July – Georges Grignard, motor racing driver (died 1977)
29 July – Pierre Braunberger, producer and actor (died 1990)
30 July – Jeanne-Marie Darré, pianist (died 1999)
8 August – André Jolivet, composer (died 1974)
9 August – Pierre Klossowski, writer, translator and artist (died 2001)
20 August – André Giriat, rower and Olympic medallist (died 1967)
5 September – Maurice Challe, General (died 1979)

October to December
10 October – Armand Marcelle, rower and Olympic medallist (died 1974)
11 October – Jean-Marie Villot, Cardinal (died 1979)
24 October – Pierre Frank, Trotskyist leader (died 1984)
18 November – Paul Paillole, soldier (died 1992)
29 November – Marcel Lefebvre, Roman Catholic archbishop (died 1991)
22 December – Pierre Brasseur, actor (died 1972)
25 December – Étienne Mattler, international soccer player (died 1986)
31 December – Guy Mollet, politician (died 1975)

Full date unknown
Jacques Baron, poet (died 1986).
Albert-Félix de Lapparent, palaeontologist and Jesuit priest (died 1975)
René Taupin, translator, critic and academic (died 1981)

Deaths

January to June
4 February – Louis-Ernest Barrias, sculptor (born 1841)
5 February – Antoine Alphonse Chassepot, gunsmith and inventor (born 1833)
24 March – Jules Verne, author (born 1828)
26 May – Alphonse James de Rothschild, banker and philanthropist (born 1827)
1 June – Émile Delahaye, automotive pioneer (born 1843)
4 June – Edme-Armand-Gaston d'Audiffret-Pasquier, politician (born 1823)

July to December
9 August – Placide Louis Chapelle, Archbishop in Roman Catholic Archdiocese of New Orleans (born 1842)
19 August – William-Adolphe Bouguereau, painter (born 1825)
13 September – René Goblet, politician, Prime Minister of France (born 1828)
14 September – Pierre Savorgnan de Brazza, explorer (born 1852)
25 September – Jacques Marie Eugène Godefroy Cavaignac, politician (born 1853)
12 December – François Paul Meurice, dramatist (born 1818)

See also
 List of French films before 1910

References

1900s in France